The men's hammer throw at the 2014 European Athletics Championships took place at the Letzigrund on 14 and 16 August.

Medalists

Results

Qualification
75.00 (Q) or at least 12 best performers (q) advanced to the Final.

Final

References

Hammer Throw
Hammer throw at the European Athletics Championships